Bud Powell's Moods is a studio album by jazz pianist Bud Powell, released in 1956 by Norgran, featuring sessions that Powell recorded in 1954 and 1955.

The album was re-issued by Verve, and released as a CD replica by Verve (Japan) in 2006 (POCJ-2740). The sessions (with alternate takes) are also available on CD on The Complete Bud Powell on Verve (1994) box set.

History 
The sessions on this album mark the beginning of a two-year period (from June 1954 to September 1956) when Powell recorded exclusively for Norman Granz at Fine Sound Studios in New York.

The two Powell compositions, "Buttercup" (named after Powell's childhood friend Altevia Edwards) and "Fantasy in Blue", are both up-tempo, in contrast to the generally mellow mood of the rest of the album.

Track listing 12" LP (MGN 1064, MGV 8154) 
All songs were written by Bud Powell, except where noted.
 "Moonlight in Vermont" (Karl Suessdorf, John Blackburn) – 3:35
 "Spring Is Here" (Richard Rodgers, Lorenz Hart) – 3:27
 "Buttercup" – 2:59
 "Fantasy in Blue" – 3:04
 "It Never Entered My Mind" (Rodgers, Hart) – 2:56
 "A Foggy Day" (George Gershwin, Ira Gershwin) – 3:45

 "Time Was" (aka "Duerme" «Sleep») (Miguel Prado, Gabriel Luna, Bob Russell) – 4:17
 "My Funny Valentine" (Rodgers, Hart) – 2:53
 "I Get a Kick out of You" (Cole Porter) – 4:26
 "You Go to My Head" (J. Fred Coots, Haven Gillespie) – 4:11
 "The Best Thing for You (Would Be Me)" (Irving Berlin) – 2:41

Personnel

Performance 
 Bud Powell – piano
June 2, 1954, Fine Sound Studios, New York, side A tracks 1-4.
 George Duvivier – bass
 Art Taylor – drums
June 4, 1954, Fine Sound Studios, New York, side A tracks 5-6 and side B tracks 1-2.
 Percy Heath – bass
 Art Taylor – drums
January 12, 1955, Fine Sound Studios, New York, side B tracks 3-5.
 Lloyd Trotman – bass
 Art Blakey – drums

Production 
 Norman Granz – producer
 David Stone Martin – cover design

Release history 

The two June 1954 sessions were originally released on a 10" LP called The Artistry of Bud Powell on Norgran in 1954.

The Artistry of Bud Powell 10" LP (MGN 23) 
 "Moonlight in Vermont" (Suessdorf, Blackburn)
 "Spring Is Here" (Rodgers, Hart)
 "Buttercup"
 "Fantasy in Blue"

 "It Never Entered My Mind" (Rodgers, Hart)
 "A Foggy Day" (Gershwin, Gershwin)
 "Time Was" (Prado, Luna, Russell)
 "My Funny Valentine" (Rodgers, Hart)

References 

Bud Powell albums
1956 albums
Albums produced by Norman Granz
Norgran Records albums